Villosa iris, the rainbow mussel or rainbow-shell, is a species of freshwater mussel, an aquatic bivalve mollusk in the family Unionidae, the river mussels.

Reproduction
All Unionidae are known to use the gills, fins, or skin of a host fish for nutrients during the larval glochidia stage. Female villosa iris attract host fish by imitating a crayfish. Elongate papillae on the mantle margin resemble antennae, legs, and eyes. They also mimic crayfish behavior, moving the papillae independently like legs, and use "tail tucking" motions. Juvenile mussels bury in the sediment just below its surface, and feed on  bacteria and bacterial-sized particles including algae.

Distribution 
This species is widely distributed throughout the St. Lawrence, upper Mississippi, Ohio, Tennessee, and Cumberland River Basins.

Conservation Status 
Villosa iris is considered globally secure, but is the focus of conservation concern at the edges of its range in areas like Ontario and Wisconsin.  In Canada, V. iris is listed as endangered by COSEWIC and Ontario. In Wisconsin, it is listed as state endangered.

References

iris
Molluscs of North America
Freshwater bivalves
Fauna of the Great Lakes region (North America)